María Elena Ballesteros Triguero (born 6 July 1981) is a Spanish actress.

Biography 
Ballesteros began her career doing commercials while going to castings to achieve her dream of becoming an actress. Her first opportunity arrived with the role of Lola in the TV series More than friends in 1996.She worked with Paz Vega, Melani Olivares and Alberto San Juan, among others. At the same time, she hosted the children's program Club Disney.

Afterwards she was in the TV series Journalists, in which she played José Topped's daughter. This role made her famous and opened the doors of cinema.
Since then, she has worked with directors like Manuel Iborra, Gerardo Smith, Mariano Barroso and Roger Young. She stood out in Álvaro Díaz Lorenzo's Coffee Alone or with Them, one of the more popular Spanish films of 2007. She was also in Fermat's Room which had a big international cast. In 2009, she filmed in Buenos Aires for the film All and sundry with director Manolo González, whose screenplay was rewarded by the ASGAE.

She went back to work in television, starring in the comedy-musical Paco and Veva with Hugo Silva, Table for five and an intrigue series called Personal Reasons. In the summer of 2007, she began the shooting under Antenna 3, broadcasting with the title The Family Kills, in which she had a lead role with the actor Daniel Guzmán. In July 2011, she premièred in the series Scarlet Tip on Telecinco.

Since June 2011 she has written a personal blog on Fotogramas called "Now I think ...".

Personal life 
She has a daughter named Jimena from her relationship with actor Paco Marín. She married comic Dani Mateo on 23 July 2010 whom she met during the shooting of The Family Kills. In July 2016, the couple has announce their divorce.

Filmography

Radio 
 Which disgust of summer (2014) with Dani Mateo in the Chain BE.
 At present collaborator of " The Dovecot" ( Oh My LOL) in the Chain Be

References

External links 
  in Internet Movie Database (in English)
 Index card in Cinemanía
 Index card in Pizquita
 Interview in 2006
 Interview in 20 minutes on The family Kills in July 2007
 Official blog Elena Ballesteros
 Personal blog of Elena Ballesteros

Actresses from Madrid
Spanish film actresses
Spanish television actresses
Spanish bloggers
1981 births
Living people
Spanish women bloggers
21st-century Spanish actresses